This Is... may refer to:

 This Is... (book series), a series of children's travel books by Miroslav Sasek
 This Is... (TV series), a British entertainment show
 This Is... Icona Pop, an album by Icona Pop
 This Is...24-7 Spyz!, an EP by 24-7 Spyz
 This Is...Brenda, an album by Brenda Lee
 This Is...TAT, an EP by TAT